The Temple University Graduate Students Association (TUGSA) is a graduate employee union at Temple University. The union won recognition on September 26, 2001 when the Temple board of trustees voted to recognize their union. The union ratified its first contract on May 18, 2002 and the Trustees voted to ratify it on May 14. While graduate employees had formed unions in other states since 1970, the TUGSA contract marked the first time that graduate employees in Pennsylvania bargained a contract with their employer. TUGSA is affiliated with the American Federation of Teachers/AFL–CIO.

First contract
Like the first contract for GSOC at New York University the first TUGSA contract resulted in significant improvements for the graduate employees in terms of their healthcare and wages. The contract was also significant in that it marked the first time that Temple University allowed same sex domestic partners to enroll in the health plan.

See also
 Coalition of Graduate Employee Unions
 List of graduate student employee unions
 National Labor Relations Board

External links
 Official website

Graduate Students Association
Graduate school trade unions
Organizations established in 2001
American Federation of Teachers
Student organizations by university or college in the United States